Surrey Hills is a suburb of Melbourne, Victoria, Australia, 11 km east of Melbourne's Central Business District, located within the Cities of Boroondara and Whitehorse local government areas.

Surrey Hills was settled in the late 19th century and evolved with slightly smaller blocks and slightly simpler housing than its neighbour Canterbury. Most of Surrey Hills' streets are lined with now-mature European trees, mostly plane and pin oak.

It is bordered by Elgar Road in the east, Riversdale Road in the south, Highfield Road in the west and Whitehorse Road in the north.

History

The Surrey Hills area was acquired from the Crown by Henry Elgar, as part of his Special Survey purchase in 1841.

The Surrey Hills area was first developed by a Real Estate consortia, following the extension of the railway line from Camberwell to Lilydale in 1882. Surrey Hills Post Office opened on 1 October 1884. Housing estates were laid out and lovely period homes built in either brick or weatherboard, with most designs being influenced by the Victorian, Federation and Edwardian era. The streets were planted mainly with avenues of Pin Oak and Plane trees, which are now mature and offer a pleasant shady vista. The streets have impressive names such as Empress, Kingston, Surrey, Balmoral, Leopold, Windsor, Albert and Wolseley, but the area was considered too distant from the nearest shopping districts: Camberwell to the west and Box Hill to the east. The economic depression of the 1890s brought development to a halt and the next major phase of suburban development didn't take place until after the First World War.

During the 1990s, the last bank branch in the Union Road shopping strip closed, which caused some concern within both the local community and local traders. On 24 February 2003, the Surrey Hills Community Bank (a community bank branch of Bendigo Bank) opened for business in Union Road.

Today
Surrey Hills contains both the 'English Counties District', which is a small area between Canterbury and Riversdale Roads, where the streets are named after English Counties, including Norfolk, Durham, Kent, Middlesex, Essex and Suffolk Roads and the 'Chatham Precinct', which is located between Canterbury, Union, Mont Albert & Chatham Roads. The latter streets are named after English places (Croydon, Guildford & Surrey) and Sir Garnet Road, named in honour of a famous British Army General (Garnet Wolseley, 1st Viscount Wolseley, born in Ireland, who served a distinguished career and became a hero in the British Army in the late 1800s & early 1900).

The suburb has 3 local primary schools; Surrey Hills Primary, Chatham Primary School and Our Lady's of Perpetual Succour. Surrey Hills' Central Business District is relatively small, consisting of a 300-metre strip of shops along Union Road.

The neighbourhood centre features Surrey Hills railway station (on the Belgrave and Lilydale railway lines). Heading out from Melbourne's CBD, Union Road is the first railway level crossing on the Belgrave/Lilydale train line. Surrey Hills also has Chatham railway station, north of Canterbury Road, between Stanley Terrace and Junction Road. Chatham Station can be accessed from the north by laneways between houses, beginning near the Mont Albert Road General Store, then continuing south along the Canterbury Sports Ground pathway. Most working residents of Surrey Hills commute to Melbourne either by car or train. To reach a safe bicycle path for the city commute, cyclists must travel south to the Gardiners Creek Trail or north to the Yarra River Trail, via the Outer Circle Trail. A bike lane is located on Mont Albert Road.

To the north, Surrey Hills is also serviced by the route 109 tram, which continues from Port Melbourne, along Collins Street (Melb.CBD), along Whitehorse Rd, to Box Hill and in the south, the route 70 tram travels along Riversdale Road from the city to the Wattle Park terminus at the Elgar Road junction. Canterbury Road between Station Street, Box Hill and Union Road, Surrey Hills is the only east–west major road not served by any public transport, although historically the road was served by busses until the 1960s. There are a few remaining bus stop seats on Canterbury Road, but the nearest operating public transport is via Riversdale Road to the South (trams), Mont Albert Station to the north (trains), Union Road (busses) and Surrey Hills station (trains) to the west. These points all represent around one mile in distance from the peak of Surrey Hills (at around the position of the large telecommunication towers on the corner of Canterbury Road and Harding Street).

Parks and gardens

The major parks and gardens in Surrey Hills are Surrey Gardens and South Surrey Park. Surrey Hills is also adjacent to Wattle Park, which is just across Riversdale Road to the south, in Burwood.

Sport

Canterbury Sports Ground is located in the north-west of the suburb and has 3 sporting clubs. It is the home ground of the Australian Rules Football club, Canterbury 'Cobras', who currently compete in the Eastern Football League, as well as the Canterbury Cricket Club, which plays on a turf wicket and Canterbury Tennis Club, which has its own clubhouse and 4 en-tou-cas courts.

See also 
 City of Box Hill – Surrey Hills was previously within this former local government area.
 City of Camberwell – Surrey Hills was previously within this former local government area.

References

Suburbs of Melbourne
Suburbs of the City of Whitehorse
Suburbs of the City of Boroondara